The Rani is a fictional character in the British science fiction television series Doctor Who. She was played by Kate O'Mara.

The Rani is a renegade Time Lord, an amoral scientist who considers everything secondary to her research; she has been known to enslave entire planets such as Miasimia Goria in order to have a ready supply of experimental subjects and a place to carry out her experiments uninterrupted. Her major interest is in tinkering with other species' biochemistry — she was exiled from Gallifrey after some of her lab mice, as a result of an experiment, grew to enormous size and ate the President's pet cat, and according to The Master, "took a chunk out of him too". She was established as being the same age as the Doctor".

The Rani was, like the Master, intended as a recurring foe of the Doctor, but only appeared in two serials, The Mark of the Rani (1985) and Time and the Rani (1987), before Doctor Who went off the air in 1989. The Rani also appeared as the principal villain in Dimensions in Time, a 1993 Doctor Who charity special created for Children in Need. She was intended to appear in another serial entitled Yellow Fever and How to Cure It, but the show was put on hiatus and the serial was cancelled.

Television episodes
The Rani appears in two Doctor Who classic series serials, The Mark of the Rani (1985) and Time and the Rani (1987), portrayed both times by Kate O'Mara. She made her final appearance as the Rani in 1993, in a Children In Need mini story called Dimensions in Time, comprising two episodes to celebrate Doctor Who 30th Anniversary.

The Mark of the Rani (1985)
In The Mark of the Rani, the Sixth Doctor (Colin Baker) is attempting to visit Kew Gardens when the TARDIS is drawn off course and instead lands in Killingworth during the time of the Industrial Revolution.

The Rani is ruling the planet Miasimia Goria where she has removed the need for sleep from the alien subjects.  This causes the planet to collapse into chaos, as without sleep the aliens turned violent. To restore order and continue her experiments, she begins stealing the chemical that allows sleep from human brains, carrying this out in violent periods of Earth's history so her experiment's after-effects would go unnoticed. When carrying this out during the Luddite rebellion, her operation is co-opted into the Master's attempt at hijacking the Industrial Revolution and killing the Sixth Doctor. The Doctor and his companion, Peri (Nicola Bryant), are shocked, as they believed the Master to have been destroyed. Eventually, the Doctor traps the Rani and the Master in the Rani's TARDIS, where an embryo of a Tyrannosaurus rex  starts to grow as the result of a time spillage. Her operation is thwarted.

Time and the Rani (1987)

In Time and the Rani, the Rani uses a time funnel to trap the Doctor's TARDIS. The ferocity and resulting turbulence have devastating effect, forcing him to regenerate into the Seventh Doctor. When the Doctor (Sylvester McCoy) wakes up, he figures out what the Rani is doing, and a Tetrap (from the planet Tetrapyriarbus) knocks him out when he threatens to smash a piece of machinery. The Rani then injects the Doctor with an amnesia drug, and disguises herself as the Doctor's companion, Mel (Bonnie Langford); she later uses a hologram of Mel to get the Doctor to return a vital piece of machinery.

It is revealed that the Rani plans to use an approaching asteroid composed of strange matter and various equations calculated by assorted geniuses from across history—including the Doctor—to turn the planet into a temporal manipulator that would allow her to manipulate evolution on a cosmic scale. This plan is thwarted when the Doctor is able to delay the missile the Rani would have used to destroy the asteroid, causing it to just miss its target. The Rani manages to escape in her TARDIS; however, the Tetraps are also in there, and have her take them back to Tetrapyriarbus to help them with their larger tasks.

In the novelisation written by Pip and Jane Baker, it is revealed that the Rani, and the Master, escaped the growing T-Rex due to the same time spillage that made it mature; it grew so rapidly that it broke its spine on the ceiling of the Rani's TARDIS.

Dimensions in Time (1993)
O'Mara reprised her role as the Rani in Dimensions in Time, which was broadcast over two nights as part of Children in Need for the 30th anniversary of Doctor Who. In this story, the Rani attempts to trap the first seven incarnations of the Doctor in a time loop. She is also seen to be travelling with a companion called Cyrian.

Other appearances
Pip and Jane Baker wrote the Rani as the lead in the BBV audio drama The Rani Reaps the Whirlwind, following on from Time and the Rani, and also wrote her as the villain in a Choose Your Own Adventure-style children's game book entitled Race Against Time.

The Rani appears in the Virgin Missing Adventures spin-off novel State of Change (1994) by Christopher Bulis. Here, the Master escapes the Rani's TARDIS in The Mark of the Rani by splitting the console room from the rest of her TARDIS, leaving the Rani adrift in a space-time bubble until she encounters a benign entity that creates a distorted pocket reality where the Egyptians possess 20th-century technology due to their access to the databanks of a duplicate of the Doctor's TARDIS console. The Rani tries her hand at political machinations in this reality before the intervention of the Doctor breaks her control over the entity, at which point she escapes in her repaired TARDIS.

The Rani is mentioned in BBC Books' Eighth Doctor Adventure novel The Ancestor Cell (2000) by Peter Anghelides and Stephen Cole. The Eighth Doctor's former companion, Fitz, now Father Kreiner of Faction Paradox, claims to have killed the Rani and the Master (during the "Second War in Heaven" described in Lawrence Miles' EDA: Interference: Book One), and now displays their skulls as trophies.

The Past Doctor Adventure novel Divided Loyalties (1999) by Gary Russell, features a dream sequence where the Rani is one of a group of promising young Time Lords called "the Deca" which include many future renegades, including the Doctor, the War Chief, the Meddling Monk and the Master. The dream also suggests that her given name is (or begins with) "Ushas", likely a reference to the Vedic goddess of that name.

The Rani briefly appears in an artificially created parallel universe in the Past Doctor Adventures novel The Quantum Archangel (2001). In this reality she, the Master, the Meddling Monk, and Drax are posing as a group of German scientists.

The short story "Rescue", by David Roden (who also wrote Dimensions in Time), reveals how the Rani rescued Cyrian from a Cyberman invasion of his home planet. It was published in the Doctor Who Yearbook 1995.

The Rani returns as the main antagonist of the 50th anniversary Sixth Doctor Puffin E-short "Something Borrowed" by author Richelle Mead.

Audio dramas
At the time of her death in 2014, O'Mara was in negotiation with Big Finish Productions, producer of fully licensed audio dramas based on the Doctor Who franchise, to reprise the character. Producer David Richardson said:

Scottish actress Siobhan Redmond was subsequently cast as a new incarnation of the Rani, first appearing in the 2014 story The Rani Elite. In this Sixth Doctor audio adventure, the Rani attempts to reverse engineer chaos theory using the collective minds of the academic elite attending the College of Advanced Galactic Education. Her meeting with the Sixth Doctor is out-of-sequence, similar to television stories featuring River Song, and it is the first audio adventure to reference the Deca, specifically Ushas (the Rani's previous moniker) and Mortimus.

Redmond's incarnation of the Rani returns in the 2015 audio drama Planet of the Rani, having been imprisoned for 90 years and then escaping to seek her revenge against the Doctor. She arrives on the planet Miasimia Goria, a world she once ruled over, where the current leader, Raj Kahnu, regards her as his mother whilst also harbouring deep contempt for her. Kahnu, a genetically engineered humanoid who resides inside the body of a mechanical cockroach, later allows the Rani to leave the planet in a TARDIS survival pod that her previous incarnation had left there.

The Rani's TARDIS 

Unlike the Doctor's TARDIS, the Rani's TARDIS has a fully functional chameleon circuit, and can still disguise itself wherever it lands. It can also be opened with the Doctor's TARDIS key.

In Mark of the Rani, the Rani hides her TARDIS (disguised as a cabinet) behind a screen, and has managed to link it to, as the Doctor says, a Stattenheim remote control, which he describes as "genius". It is in this TARDIS that she and the Master get trapped with a gradually growing Tyrannosaurus rex embryo.

In Time and the Rani, her TARDIS appears as a reflective pyramid. She is eventually trapped by the Tetraps in her TARDIS.
In Dimensions in Time, for scenes set inside the Rani's TARDIS, the Doctor's console from the original series was set inside a TARDIS console room mock-up constructed for a recent fan convention as the Rani's original console room for the series had already been destroyed.

List of appearances

Television episodes
The Mark of the Rani (1985) by Pip & Jane Baker
Time and the Rani (1987) by Pip & Jane Baker
Dimensions in Time (1993) by John Nathan-Turner and David Roden (charity episode)

Audio plays
The Rani Reaps the Whirlwind by Pip and Jane Baker
The Rani Elite by Justin Richards (New incarnation portrayed by Siobhan Redmond)
Planet of the Rani by Marc Platt

Novels
State of Change by Christopher Bulis (Virgin Missing Adventures)
Divided Loyalties (appears in flashbacks) by Gary Russell  (BBC Past Doctor Adventures)
Race Against Time by Pip & Jane Baker (Find Your Fate)
Something Borrowed by Richelle Mead

Annual
Rescue by David Roden (Doctor Who Yearbook 1995)

References

External links

Television characters introduced in 1985
Time Lords
Recurring characters in Doctor Who
Female characters in television
Fictional mad scientists
Fictional scientists in television
Female supervillains
Extraterrestrial supervillains
Female villains